World Electronic Sports Games (WESG) is an international esports championship tournament based in Shanghai and organized by AliSports. The finals were held in December 2016.

The World Electronic Sports Games heavily bases itself on the Olympic Games. In the first 3 years, teams had to be composed of players of the same nationality to emphasize national pride, making it unique in the esports world. As a result of this, some national teams were formed only to play in WESG. This rule was softened for the 2019 edition (and possibly onwards), with teams being allowed to have 2 foreign members. The event also has separate tournaments for men and women. Tournaments generally follow single-elimination rules.

Games
The following games were featured. In 2017, WESG expanded Counter-Strike: Global Offensive and Hearthstone to include female tournaments.

Counter Strike
Dota 2
Hearthstone
Starcraft II

Tournament history

2016
As of March 2016, qualifying rounds for the first edition were expected to begin in April 2016. The event took place in Shangai.

Despite the large prize pools, many top contenders were not at the event, especially with CS:GO's first major of 2017 right around the corner. WESG 2016 for Counter-Strike: Global Offensive (CS:GO) was the last premier tournament before the ELEAGUE Major 2017. France's Team EnVyUs beat out Poland's Team Kinguin to take home the majority of CS:GO's biggest prize pool while Poland's number one took third place by defeating Turkey's Space Soldiers before booking a ticket to Atlanta for the major.

In Dota 2, the Filipino team TNC Pro Team downed Denmark's Cloud9 to take the grand prize. Alliance from Sweden took down Peru's hopeful Infamous to take the bronze.

In Starcraft 2, Koreans dominated as expected as Jun "TY" Tae-yang defeated compatriot Cho "Maru" Seong-ju. In the third place match, America's Alex "Neeb" Sunderhaft took down Tobias "ShoWTimE" Sieber of Germany.

Hearthstone's champion was the Philippines's Euneil "Staz" Javiñas took down Sweden's Jon "Orange" Westberg in a close grand final. The third-place match featured two Germans, and it was Raphael "BunnyHoppor" Peltzer to topple Sebastian "Xixo" Bentert.

2017
Despite being called WESG 2017, the event took place in March 2018, with the location being Haikou.

In CS:GO, with the major already past, more top teams showed up. However, teams such as SK Gaming from Brazil, which was the second most decorated team in CS:GO and world number two, and Cloud9 from the United States, which was the reigning major champions and world number three, were knocked out earlier than expected while teams such as MVP PK from South Korea and Team One from Brazil, two teams that hadn't even qualified for the major, made it much further into the bracket than expected. Sweden's Fnatic came back from a large deficit against the Space Soldiers from Turkey to take home the WESG 2017 title for Fnatic's second straight premier tournament win.

Team Russia stopped the Cinderella story of Team One in the third-place match. Dota 2 saw Team Russia take out Brazil's paiN Gaming. Team Hellas from Greece shut down the hometown Rock.Y from China in the third-place match.

South Korea dominated again in Starcraft 2 as Maru redeemed himself from last year after being the runner-up to winning the title after taking down compatriot Park "Dark" Ryung-woo. Kim "Classic" Doh-woo could not make it three Koreans in a row as he fell to Finland's Joona "Serral" Sotala in the third-place match.

Hearthstone saw Turkey's Kaan "Fujitora" Çekli defeat Michael "Luker" Luker from Canada to take home the grand prize. The unknown posesi from Japan took third place after defeating Thailand's Kantaphon "ScreaM" Suwanmalee. CS:GO's female grand final saw a close series as Russian Forces scraped past LLG Gaming of China to take home all but 100,000 of the prize pool. In the third place match, Those Damn Canadians defeated the experienced Team Sweden. Hearthstone's female grand final featured the two Chinese qualifiers as GLHuiHui defeated Lioon. Cordelia "Scarakye" Chui from the UK lost HongKong's Ip Yan in the third-place match.

2018
Despite being called WESG 2018, the event took place in March 2019, with the location being Chongqing.

The WESG 2018 tournament started only a week after IEM Katowice 2019, the first CS:GO major of 2019. This made it impossible for most top teams to participate. The only top teams in the tournament were G2, who got eliminated early from the major and fnatic, who failed to qualify to the major. Brazilian MIBR managed to participate as well, despite reaching the semi-finals in the major. This meant that they flew from Poland to China only a few days before the event. The jetlag caused an early but expected exit from the tournament in the quarter-finals, where they lost against Windigo. In the semi-finals, Polish AGO defeated fnatic and Windigo defeated G2 to advance to the grand-final. The third place decider between French G2 and Swedish fnatic was won by the French team. In the grand-final, Bulgarian Windigo won against AGO to become champion. The prize money of 500,000 was received more than a year after the tournament ended.

2019
The 2019 event was scheduled to take place in the first quarter of 2020, with the location being Chongqing, but was postponed to an unknown date due to COVID-19. Some regional qualifiers had already taken place. The one-nationality rule was softened in 2019.

As of February 2021, the tournament is not yet officially cancelled, but no announcement regarding the continuation of the tournament hasn't been made either.

References

External links

Recurring sporting events established in 2016
2016 establishments in China
Dota competitions
Sports competitions in Shanghai
Esports competitions in China
Alibaba Group
Counter-Strike competitions
StarCraft competitions
Events in Shanghai
21st century in Shanghai